The nerve of Wrisberg (named for Heinrich August Wrisberg) can refer to:
 Medial cutaneous nerve of arm
 A branch of the facial nerve, also called Nervus intermedius